The  is the oldest and most prestigious physics award in Japan.

Information

Since 1955, the Nishina Memorial Prize has been awarded annually by the Nishina Memorial Foundation. The Foundation was established to commemorate Yoshio Nishina, who was the founding father of modern physics research in Japan and a mentor of the first two Japanese Nobel Laureates, Hideki Yukawa and Sin-Itiro Tomonaga.

The Prize, of ¥500,000 (about US$5,000) and the certificate, is bestowed upon young scientists who have made substantial contributions in the field of atomic and sub-atomic physics research. As of 2014, five Nobel Prizes have been awarded to prior Nishina recipients (Leo Esaki, Makoto Kobayashi, Toshihide Maskawa, Masatoshi Koshiba, and Shuji Nakamura).

Laureates
Notable Nishina laureates are:
 1955: Kazuhiko Nishijima
 1957: Ryogo Kubo (1977 Boltzmann Medal)
 1959: Leo Esaki (1973 Nobel Prize, 1998 Japan Prize)
 1963: Chushiro Hayashi
 1968: Jun Kondo
 1969: Hisashi Matsuda, Hiroyuki Ikezi, Kyoji Nishikawa 
 1972: Kyozi Kawasaki (2001 Boltzmann Medal)
 1974: Bunji Sakita
 1976: Susumu Okubo (2006 Wigner Medal)
 1978: Akito Arima
 1979: Makoto Kobayashi (2008 Nobel Prize), Toshihide Maskawa (2008 Nobel Prize)
 1982: Akira Tonomura (1998 Benjamin Franklin Medal)
 1985: Sumio Iijima (2008 Kavli Prize)
 1987: Masatoshi Koshiba (2002 Nobel Prize), Yoji Totsuka (2007 Benjamin Franklin Medal)
 1989: Ken'ichi Nomoto (2019 Hans A. Bethe Prize)
 1990: Yoshinori Tokura
 1992: Yoshihisa Yamamoto
 1996: Shuji Nakamura (2002 Benjamin Franklin Medal, 2008 Prince of Asturias Award, 2014 Nobel Prize)
 1997: Anthony Ichiro Sanda
 2009: Hirosi Ooguri
 2012: Hideo Hosono
 2013 Hidetoshi Katori, Yoshiro Takahashi, Takahiko Kondo, Tomio Kobayashi, Shoji Asai
 2014 Yuji Matsuda, Takashi Kobayashi, Tsuyoshi Nakaya
 2015 Shinsei Ryu, Akira Furusaki, Tohru Motobayashi, Hiroyoshi Sakurai
 2016 Tadashi Takayanagi
 2017 Hiroki Takesue, Chihaya Adachi, Mahito Kohmoto
 2018 Masaru Shibata, Koichiro Tanaka
 2019 Yoshihiro Iwasa, Shigeru Yoshida, Aya Ishihara
 2020 Kazushi Kanoda, Kazuma Nakazawa

See also

 List of physics awards

References

Early career awards
Academic awards
Physics awards
Japanese science and technology awards
Awards established in 1955
1955 establishments in Japan